Mountain Lake is an unincorporated community and census-designated place (CDP) located within Liberty Township in Warren County, New Jersey, United States, that was created as part of the 2010 United States Census. As of the 2010 Census, the CDP's population was 575.

Geography
According to the United States Census Bureau, the CDP had a total area of 1.305 square miles (3.381 km2), including 1.130 square miles (2.927 km2) of land and 0.175 square miles (0.453 km2) of water (13.41%).

Demographics

Census 2010

References

Census-designated places in Warren County, New Jersey
Liberty Township, New Jersey